Christopher R. Brown (born March 5, 1971, in Walnut, Mississippi) is the Republican state representative for District 20 based about Monroe County in the northeastern portion of his state.

A businessman, Brown is divorced with five children. In 2016, his Republican colleagues named him the vice chairman of the House Republican Caucus. He is chairman of the House Appropriations Committee and serves on these other committees: Banking and Financial Services, Conservation and Water Resources, Constitution, Management and Public Health and Human Services. In 2014, Brown was elected president of the Mississippi Legislative Conservative Coalition.

In 2016, Brown was recognized by the American Conservative Union Foundation receiving the Award for Conservative Excellence

While in the legislature, Brown has worked on legislation focusing on limited government, free enterprise, individual liberties, and strengthening families. In January 2013, Brown said that he was drafting legislation that would purportedly override federal gun control rules by making Mississippi-made firearms subject to state, rather than federal law.

Brown has announced that he is running for the position of Mississippi Public Service Commissioner for the Northern District.

References

External links
 Official campaign website
 Chris Brown at Mississippi House of Representatives
 Chris Brown at Vote Smart
 Chris Brown at Ballotpedia

1971 births
Living people
Republican Party members of the Mississippi House of Representatives
Businesspeople from Mississippi
People from Tippah County, Mississippi
People from Monroe County, Mississippi
21st-century American politicians